Georgia Toews (born April 20, 1990) is a Canadian novelist. Her debut novel Hey, Good Luck Out There was published in 2022.

Toews is frequently depicted in novels by her mother Miriam Toews, including as the teenage character Nora Von Riesen who has "archly lacerating exchanges" with her mother in All My Puny Sorrows (2014, adapted for film in 2021).

Education
Toews was educated at Humber College.

Bibliography 
 Hey, Good Luck Out There (Toronto: Doubleday Canada, 2022),

References

Further reading
Toews, G., "Alcohol doesn’t define me any more, but that doesn’t mean I don’t miss it", The Globe and Mail, June 4, 2022

External links
 Georgia Toews at Doubleday Canada  
  

 
 

1990 births
Living people
Canadian humorists
Canadian women novelists
Women humorists
Writers from Winnipeg
Mennonite writers
Canadian Mennonites
Mennonite humorists
21st-century Canadian novelists
21st-century Canadian women writers
Canadian people of German-Ukrainian descent
Humber College alumni